John E. Johnson (July 5, 1873 – March 24, 1951) was a carpenter who served as a member of the Wisconsin State Assembly from Brandon, Wisconsin.

Biography
Johnson was born on July 5, 1873 in Alto, Wisconsin. He attended high school in Brandon, Wisconsin. He was the father of the politician Lester Johnson.

Career
Johnson was originally a member of the Assembly from 1916 to 1922. He was again a member during the 1935 session. Other positions Johnson held include member of the County Board of Fond du Lac County, Wisconsin from 1932 to 1934 and of the Brandon Village Board (similar to city council). He was a Republican and a Progressive.

References

External links

People from Fond du Lac County, Wisconsin
Republican Party members of the Wisconsin State Assembly
County supervisors in Wisconsin
Wisconsin city council members
Wisconsin Progressives (1924)
20th-century American politicians
1873 births
1951 deaths
People from Brandon, Wisconsin
Carpenters